In music, unified field is the 'unity of musical space' created by the free use of melodic material as harmonic material and vice versa.

The technique is most associated with the twelve-tone technique, created by its 'total thematicism' where a tone-row (melody) generates all (harmonic) material. It was also used by Alexander Scriabin, though from a diametrically opposed direction, created by his use of extremely slow harmonic rhythm which eventually led to his use of unordered pitch-class sets, usually hexachords (of six pitches) as harmony from which melody may also be created.

It may also be observed in Igor Stravinsky's Russian period, such as in Les Noces, derived from his use of folk melodies as generating material and influenced by shorter pieces by Claude Debussy, such as Voiles, and Modest Mussorgsky. In Béla Bartók's Bagatelles, and several of Alfredo Casella's Nine Piano Pieces such as No. 4 'In Modo Burlesco' the close intervallic relationship between motive and chord creates or justifies the great harmonic dissonance.

See also
Counterpoint
Polyphony
Pitch space

Sources

Post-tonal music theory
Harmony